Peter Menkhorst  is an Australian ecologist and an authority on Australian mammals and birds. He is experienced in wildlife management, including management of over-abundant Koalas, and in threatened species recovery; he has developed recovery plans and led recovery teams for a number of species including the Orange-bellied Parrot; Helmeted Honeyeater, Regent Honeyeater, Mountain Pygmy Possum and  Brush-tailed Rock Wallaby. Menkhorst is also a natural history author and recently co-authored The Australian Bird Guide.

Career
Menkhorst graduated in 1973 with a Bachelor of Science from Monash University majoring in Botany and Zoology. He has over 40 years experience in fauna survey and ecological research conducted for the Department of Environment, Land, Water and Planning and its predecessors. In 2018 he was a program leader in the Community Ecology Section at the Arthur Rylah Institute for Environmental Research, leading the Waterbird and Wetland Program.

The aim is to understand these systems and in doing so help improve conservation outcomes. The team also assists in the management of Duck Hunting in Victoria

Publications
Menkhorst has authored or co-authored field guides to both the birds and the mammals of Australia and has written many scientific papers and unpublished reports - see Google Scholar or Research Gate.

Books by Peter Menkhorst Include:

 Mammals of Victoria : Ecology, Distribution and Conservation 
 Field Guide to Mammals of Australia
 The Australian Bird Guide

Menkhorst has also reviewed numerous books for Australian Book Review. Titles reviewed include: Sentinel Chicken by Nobel Laureate Peter Doherty, Where Songs Began by Tim Low and Platypus by Ann Moyal.

Awards 

 1998 Australian Natural History Medallion
2017 Whitley Medal - Royal Zoological Society of NSW
2019 Australian Honours List Public Service Medal

References

External links

Living people
Australian ecologists
Australian ornithologists
Year of birth missing (living people)